The International Fujita scale (abbreviated as IF-Scale) rates the intensity of tornadoes and other wind events based on the severity of the damage they cause. It is used by the European Severe Storms Laboratory (ESSL) and is being worked on by various other organizations including Deutscher Wetterdienst (DWD) and State Meteorological Agency (AEMET). The scale is intended to be analogous to the Fujita and Enhanced Fujita scales, while being more applicable internationally by accounting for factors such as differences in building codes.

The International Fujita scale was drafted in 2018.

International Fujita scale parameters 
The 12 categories for the International Fujita scale are listed below, in order of increasing intensity. Although the wind speeds and photographic damage examples are updated, which are more or less still accurate. However, for the actual IF-scale in practice, damage indicators (the type of structure which has been damaged) are predominantly used in determining the tornado intensity. The IF-scale steps are defined by a central value and an error. The errors have been estimated to be 30% of the central value, resulting in overlapping speed ranges. The distances between the central values of the steps have been so chosen that the upper bound exceeds the central value of the next step, ensuring a balance between the resolution of the scale and the expected errors. Since ESSL required that the steps be consistent with the original Fujita scale, they introduced steps with – and + suffixes indicating steps one third higher or lower than the central value of the original scale, e.g. F1- equals “F2 - 1⁄3F2” and F2+ equals “F2 + 1⁄3F2”. Above F2, such a subdivision was not introduced and only full steps are used.

See also

 List of tornadoes rated on the International Fujita scale
 Beaufort scale
 Saffir–Simpson hurricane wind scale
 Severe weather terminology (United States)
 TORRO scale
 Tornado intensity and damage
 Enhanced Fujita scale
 Wind engineering
 Lists of tornadoes and tornado outbreaks
 List of F5 and EF5 tornadoes

References 

Hazard scales
Wind
Tornado
Scales in meteorology